This is a list of fighters who have participated in the Pride Fighting Championships.

List

Notes

See also
 Pride Fighting Championships
 Mixed martial arts
 List of Pride events
 List of Pride champions
 List of male mixed martial artists

References

External links

Pride Fighting Championships
Lists of mixed martial artists